Giteau's law, or the Giteau law, is a name given to a practice by the Australian Rugby Union (ARU) introduced in 2015 to allow overseas-based Australian rugby union players to be eligible to play for the Australian national rugby union team. The policy change is colloquially named after Matt Giteau, as the rule was seen primarily to bring Giteau into the Australian side for the 2015 Rugby World Cup.

Background
Before the policy change, players could play for the Australian national rugby union team only if they played for an Australian team in the Super Rugby competition.

Then-head coach Michael Cheika devised Giteau's Law to enable key overseas players to be eligible for the 2015 Rugby World Cup. In April 2015, the Australian Rugby Union announced this new arrangement. 

The rule also allows players to return to Test duty immediately if they have signed with a Super Rugby club for the following two years.

Effect
Assistant national coach Stephen Larkham said the rule enabled the Australian world cup squad to benefit from more experienced players. He said ""It’s not just a team that’s a little bit older and therefore more experienced (but) we’ve got the right number of experienced guys, the right number of older guys and the right number of younger enthusiastic guys."

The New Zealand Rugby Union Chief Executive Steve Tew said he would not implement such a rule as New Zealand  "didn’t often follow Australia".

Besides Giteau, Drew Mitchell returned from France for the 2015 World Cup under this rule.

Following the 2015 World Cup, head coach Michael Cheika hoped as much as 85% of the squad would be available for the 2019 Rugby World Cup including players available under Giteau's Law.

Current eligible players
 Caps updated: 25 August 2022

Amendments
In 2020, Rugby Australia approved an amendment to Giteau's Law that allowed up to two overseas-based players to be selected, regardless of the total overseas-based players in the squad, that did not meet the original criteria to be selected. 

In February 2022 further amendments were made to the Giteau Law. The new amendments would lower the original rule (sixty test caps for Australia and a minimum of seven seasons at Super rugby level) to thirty test caps and five years at Super Rugby level, respectively. However, the new amendment only allowed for three overseas-based players to be selected. Just five months after new amendments to the policy, coach Dave Rennie urged Rugby Australia (RA) to expand the overseas-based player policy to four.

See also

 International rugby union eligibility rules

References

Australia national rugby union team
Rugby union terminology